The following are the national records in Olympic weightlifting in Australia. Records are maintained in each weight class for the snatch lift, clean and jerk lift, and the total for both lifts by the Australian Weightlifting Federation (AWF).

Current records
Key to tables:

Men

Women

Historical records

Men (1998–2018)

Women (1998–2018)

References
General
Australian records 4 February 2023 updated
Specific

External links
AWF official website

Australia
records
Olympic weightlifting
weightlifting